Kenneth Macaulay may refer to:

 Kenneth Macaulay (colonialist) (1792–1829), colonial official in Sierra Leone
 Kenneth Macaulay (minister) (1723–1779), Scottish church minister and local historian
 Kenneth Macaulay (politician) (1815–1867), English politician